Anadyrskiy Liman or Anadyr Estuary is an estuary on the Gulf of Anadyr in Chukotka Autonomous Okrug, Siberia, Russian Federation.

Geography
It is called a liman because it is separated from the Gulf of Anadyr by the Russkaya Koshka spit in the north and another spit (Geka Point) in the south. The channel into the Gulf of Anadyr through the bar is in the east. The Anadyr Lowlands are located to the west.

Anadyrskiy Liman is divided into three parts. The outer bay receives the Tretya River (its mouth is the notch on the south shore). The southern part of the outer bay is shallow. The inner bay is called Onemen Bay and receives the Velikaya through a narrow bay on the southwest. They are separated by a promontory, with the town of Anadyr at its tip. North of the promontory is a series of lakes which form the mouth of the Kanchalan River. The Anadyr River enters the inner bay from the west.  The lake south of the Anadyr in this image is Lake Krasnoye.

References

External links
 "Anadyrskiy Liman" Geonames

Estuaries of Russia
Bodies of water of the Bering Sea
Bodies of water of Chukotka Autonomous Okrug